Barahit Union is a union parishad under Ishwarganj Upazila of Mymensingh District in the division of Mymensingh, Bangladesh. It has an area of 24.54 square kilometres and a population of 28049.

Geography
Barahit Union is bounded on the west by Tarundia and Uchakhila Unions, on the east by Maijbagh and Ishwarganj Unions, on the south by Magtula and Rajibpur Unions and on the north by Gauripur Upazila.

Demographics 
The total area of Barahit Union is 24.54 km2. According to the Bangladesh National Portal, the total population living in the union in 2001 was 28,049. According to the National Bureau of Statistics of Bangladesh census report, the number of men and women is 14,383 and 13,666 respectively.

References

Unions of Ishwarganj Upazila